Marco Morales (born January 7, 1962) is a former American football placekicker who played five seasons in the Arena Football League with the Denver Dynamite, Chicago Bruisers, Dallas Texans and New Orleans Night. He played college football at San Diego State University.

Morales attended Castle Park High School in Chula Vista, California, where he played soccer and football. Morales was an all-conference kicker at Southwestern College in Chula Vista, converting on 20 of 28 field goal attempts in two seasons, before transferring to San Diego State as a walk-on. In 1982, he tied an NCAA record with four field goals in a half against UNLV.

References

Living people
1962 births
American football placekickers
Mexican players of American football
Southwestern Jaguars football players
San Diego State Aztecs football players
Denver Dynamite (arena football) players
Chicago Bruisers players
Dallas Texans (Arena) players
New Orleans Night players
Sportspeople from Mexicali